Hargeisa National Park (HNP) is a national park in Hargeisa, Somaliland. Located outside the city of Hargeisa in the north.

See also
Daallo Mountain

Notes

References

National parks of Somaliland
Hargeisa